Claridge Hotel may refer to:

in Argentina
Claridge Hotel, Buenos Aires

in the United Kingdom
Claridge's, London

in the United States
Casa Faena, hotel in Miami Beach, Florida, formerly known as the Claridge Hotel
Claridge Atlantic City, New Jersey
Hotel Claridge, formerly in Times Square, New York City